Dancer is a surname. Notable people with the surname include:
 Sir Eric Dancer KCVO CBE (born 1940), Lord-Lieutenant of Devon 1998-2015
 Barry Dancer (born 1952), Australian former field hockey player
Daniel Dancer (1716–1794), English miser
 Edward Norman Dancer (born 1946), Australian mathematician
 Faye Dancer (1925–2002), player in the All-American Girls Professional Baseball League
 John Benjamin Dancer (1812–1887), scientific instrument maker and inventor of microphotography
 Ronald S. Dancer (1949-2022), American politician
 Stanley Dancer (1927–2005), American harness racing driver and trainer
 Thomas Dancer (c.1750–1811), British physician and botanist